The 2015 Colonial Athletic Association women's basketball tournament was held March 13–16, 2015 at the Show Place Arena in Upper Marlboro, Maryland. Champion James Madison received an automatic bid to the 2015 NCAA Tournament.

The 2015 tournament features ten teams with the addition of Elon.

Seeds

Schedule

Bracket

See also
 2015 CAA men's basketball tournament

References

External links
 2015 CAA Women's Basketball Championship

Colonial Athletic Association women's basketball tournament
 
CAA women's basketball tournament
CAA women's basketball tournament
Sports competitions in Prince George's County, Maryland
College basketball tournaments in Maryland
Women's sports in Maryland